Tolo Lake is a shallow, natural lake in camas prairie in Idaho County, Idaho, United States. An area of about  including the lake was listed on the National Register of Historic Places in 2011.

It is a historic rendez-vous site of the Nez Perce and others.

It also has historic significance from the Nez Perce War and the Battle of White Bird Canyon.

Mammoth bones were discovered there in 1995.

See also

 National Register of Historic Places listings in Idaho County, Idaho

References

External links

 Tolo Lake page on NPS website

National Register of Historic Places in Idaho
Lakes of Idaho
Idaho County, Idaho